Ruhland station is located in the town of Ruhland in northwestern Upper Lusatia in the south of the German state of Brandenburg on the Großenhain–Cottbus railway and the Węgliniec–Roßlau railway. The station is a heritage-listed building.

History 

The Cottbus-Großenhain Railway Company (Cottbus-Großenhainer Eisenbahn-Gesellschaft) was founded at the end of the 19th century by the railway financier Karl Eduard Zachariae von Lingenthal. Ruhland station began operations with the opening of the Großenhain–Cottbus railway on 20 April 1870.  It became the administrative seat of the Upper Lusatian Railway Company (Oberlausitzer Eisenbahn-Gesellschaft), when it was established on 11 October 1871. The Upper Lusatian Railway opened the Kohlfurt (now Węgliniec)–Horka–Ruhland railway line on 1 June 1874. Ruhland became an important hub in the Prussian railway network. On 1 September 1883 the company and Ruhland station were taken over by the Prussian state. It operated direct trains to Magdeburg, Breslau (now Wrocław) in Lower Silesia, Dresden, Prague and Cottbus. Today, the station, which was once a hub of services between the Province of Lower Silesia, the Duchy of Anhalt and the Kingdom of Saxony, is only a stop for regional traffic.

Planned expansion and renovation

Ruhland town and regional businesses are promoting the development and renovation of the station. Discussions between Ruhland and Deutsche Bahn have been going on for more than ten years. The euphoria of reunification has long since turned into scepticism. Deutsche Bahn stated in July 2010 that the first work on the station would be carried out from 2015 to 2019. It was estimated that the work would cost €15,000.

Intermodal terminal 

Ruhland station has a significant role in handling traffic to and from the premises of BASF Schwarzheide GmbH, which is about three kilometres away in the neighbouring town of Schwarzheide. Currently about 60,000 freight movements are handled annually at the station.

Former branch lines

In 1875, the Upper Lusatian Railway Company opened a branch line from Ruhland to the Lauchhammer iron works that later connected to the Zschipkau-Finsterwalde Railway (Schipkau-Finsterwalder Eisenbahn, ZFE). Passenger services closed in 1962.

The section from Ruhland to Lauchhammer Ost  still serves as an industrial siding, mainly for handling the traffic from BASF Schwarzheide to and from BASF’s factories in Ludwigshafen am Rhein.

Services

Rail services 

The following services stop at Ruhland station (as of 13 December 2015):

A pair of Regionalbahn RB 49 services from Cottbus to Falkenberg (Elster) is extended daily to/from Stralsund via Berlin as Regional-Express RE 5.

Bus services 
The station is also connected by several bus services: routes 601 (Senftenberg–Lauchammer), 610 (Ruhland–Großräschen), 611 (Schwarzheide–Ruhland–Guteborn–Hosena/Jannowitz) and 609 (Schwarzheide–Buckersdorf/Großmehlen/Ortrand).

References

External links
Construction work information of Deutsche Bahn 
 
 
 

Railway stations in Brandenburg
Railway stations in Germany opened in 1870
station
1870 establishments in Prussia
Buildings and structures in Oberspreewald-Lausitz